Easdale is a ghost town in Wheatland Township, Ellis County, Kansas, United States.

History
Easdale was issued a post office in 1878. The post office was moved to Pfeifer in 1887.

References

Further reading

External links
 Ellis County maps: Current, Historic, KDOT

Former populated places in Ellis County, Kansas
Former populated places in Kansas